Nebka (meaning "Lord of the ka") is the throne name of an ancient Egyptian pharaoh of the Third Dynasty during the Old Kingdom period, in the 27th century BCE. He is thought to be identical with the Hellenized name Νεχέρωχις (Necherôchis or Necherôphes) recorded by the Egyptian priest Manetho of the much later Ptolemaic period.

Nebka's name is otherwise recorded from the near contemporaneous tomb of a priest of his cult as well as in a possible cartouche from Beit Khallaf, later New Kingdom king lists and in a story of the Westcar Papyrus. If the Beit Khallaf seal impression is indeed a cartouche of Nebka, then he is the earliest king to have thus recorded his throne name, otherwise this innovation can be ascribed to Huni.

Nebka is thought by most Egyptologists to be the throne name of Sanakht, the third or fourth ruler of the Third Dynasty, who is sparsely attested by archaeological evidence and must have had only a short reign. Older hypotheses followed two New Kingdom sources which credit Nebka with founding the Third Dynasty, a view that is now believed to contradict the archaeological evidence. The tomb of Nebka has not been located with any certainty and three locations have been proposed: a mastaba in Beit Khallaf attributed to Sanakht by John Garstang, a mudbrick structure in Abu Rawash seen as the tomb of Nebka by Swelim and Dodson, and the Unfinished Northern Pyramid of Zawyet El Aryan.

Name sources 
The earliest source for Nebka's name is the mastaba tomb of the late Third Dynasty high official Akhetaa who, among other positions, held that of "priest of Nebka". The exact location of Akhetaa's mastaba is now lost, hindering further research. It may be near Abusir, where some relief-bearing blocks from the tomb were found re-used as construction material.

The next oldest source is found in a story recorded on the Westcar Papyrus which dates to the Seventeenth Dynasty, but which was likely first written during the late Middle Kingdom period, possibly at the end of the Twelfth Dynasty. There, a king Nebka is cited in the story known as “Nebka and the crocodile”, which pertains to adultery and the typical sort of punishment for that during the Old Kingdom. The story throws a positive light on the personality of king Nebka, who is depicted as a strict but lawful judge. He punishes mischief and unethical behavior, in this case punishing the betrayal of an unfaithful wife with the death penalty. The passage involving Nebka starts after a magician, Ubaoner, throws a commoner who had an affair with Ubaoner's wife to a crocodile, who swallows him for seven days:

The subsequent historical sources date to the Nineteenth Dynasty: the Royal Table of Saqqara mentions a Nebkara close to the end of the Third Dynasty as the direct successor of Sekhemket and predecessor of Huni. This Nebkara is likely a variant of the name Nebka. The near contemporaneous Abydos King list and Turin canon record a king Nebka, this time as the founder of the Third Dynasty.

Finally, a king Necherôchis is listed as the founder of the Third Dynasty in the Aegyptiaca, a history of Egypt written in the 3rd century BCE during the reign of Ptolemy II (283–246 BCE) by an Egyptian priest, Manetho. No copies of the Aegyptiaca have survived to this day and it is now known only through later writings by Sextus Julius Africanus and Eusebius, themselves quoted by the Byzantine scholar George Syncellus. According to these sources, the Aegyptiaca gave Necherôchis as the predecessor of Sesorthos or Tosorthros, both names being widely held to refer to Djoser as the Aegyptiaca credits Sesorthos with the invention of stone architecture. Necherôchis (Eusebius) or Necherôphes (Africanus), both likely Hellenized forms of Nebka, is said to have faced a rebellion of Libyans during his reign, but "when the moon waxed beyond reckoning, they surrendered in terror". Africanus further credits Necherôphes with 28 years of reign.

Identity 

Nebka's identity with respect to other Third Dynasty rulers is now partially settled. Most scholars including Thomas Schneider, Darell Baker, Peter Clayton, Michel Baud, Jaromír Málek, Toby Wilkinson, Kenneth Anderson Kitchen, Stephan Seidlmayer, Michael Rice, Donald Leprohon and Rainer Stadelmann are convinced that Nebka was identical with Hor-Sanakht. This opinion is based on a single fragmentary clay seal discovered by Garstand in 1902 in Beit Khallaf, a locality north of Abydos. Kurt Sethe proposed that the damaged sealing shows the serekh of Sanakht next to a fragmentary cartouche housing an archaic form of the sign for "ka". The cartouche is believed to be just large enough to have enclosed the further sign "Neb". In addition, a further two dozen sealings of Sanakht were uncovered in Beit Khallaf's nearby tomb K2, which John Garstang believed to be this king's tomb. If the identification of Nebka with Sanakht is correct, then Nebka is the earliest king to write his throne name in a cartouche and otherwise this innovation would pass to Huni.

Egyptologists John D. Degreef, Nabil Swelim and Wolfgang Helck resisted the equation of Nebka with Sanakht in earlier research. They underline the heavily damaged nature of the Beit Khallaf seal fragment and hence that the alleged cartouche can be hardly identified with certainty. Instead, they propose that the cartouche could actually be the oval-shaped crest of a royal fortress with one or several boats in it, a city that may have already been mentioned under the name “Elder's boats” in sources dating to the Second Dynasty king Peribsen.

Chronology

Nebka's relative chronological position has been the subject of debate in earlier Egyptology, as he is listed as the first pharaoh of the Third Dynasty in both the Turin (third column, seventh line) and Abydos (15th entry) king lists. Some Egyptologists including Málek tried to reconcile this position in the list with the evidence from Beit Khallaf by proposing that Nebka Sanakht reigned for a short time between the last Second Dynasty ruler Khasekhemwy and Djoser, whom Málek sees as a younger brother to Sanakht.

This is now understood to "flatly contradict" (quoting Wilkinson) much archaeological evidence, which rather point to Djoser as the first ruler of the dynasty and Sekhemket as his immediate successor. For example, numerous seal fragments of Djoser uncovered in the tomb of Khasekhemwy strongly suggest that he buried this king who might have been his father. Khasekhemwy's wife and likely Djoser's mother, queen Nimaethap, was herself buried in tomb K1 of Beit Khallaf which yielded many seals of Djoser but none of Sanakht. Nimaethap was furthermore given the title of “Mother of a king”, that is with a singular, implying that she had only one son who ascended the throne, precluding the reign of Sanakht between those of Khasekhemwy and Djoser. Kitchen also observes that the Turin Canon gives exactly the same reign length of 19 years to both Nebka and Djoser, hinting at an error in the placement of Nebka's name on the canon and the attribution of Djoser's regnal years to Nebka. In addition, the Saqqara king list places Nebka after Sekhemket rather than before Djoser.

Further indirect evidence for Nebka's placement in the late Third Dynasty comes from the Papyrus Westcar, which records the story of "Nebka and the crocodile" between two tales set in the reigns of Djoser and Huni and Sneferu, respectively. Evidence from the tomb of Akhetaa regarding the chronological position of Nebka is inconclusive: on the one hand, Akhetaa's title could indicate that he was priest of the cult of the reigning king and thus that Nebka was alive at the end of the Third Dynasty. On the other hand, it could equally be that Akhetaa was priest of a funerary cult, in which case Nebka's placement could be somewhat earlier.

Given the likely identification of Nebka with Sanakht and the placement of the later in the late Third Dynasty, perhaps as the penultimate king of this line, it is possible that Nebka Sanakht reigned for six years. This is the duration credited by the Turin canon to the immediate predecessor of Huni, whose name is lost, and in any case a short reign better fits the scant archaeological evidence for both Nebka and Sanakht.

Tomb

The tomb of Nebka has not been located with any certainty, nor has that of Sanakht. Garstang, who excavated mastaba K2 at Beit Khallaf, believed that it belonged to Sanakht as seals bearing this pharaoh's name were uncovered there, beside a burial. Dieter Arnold and other Egyptologists now think mastaba K2 was the tomb of a private individual rather than a royal one, though the old theory is still supported.

Swelim and Aidan Dodson have instead proposed that a mudbrick structure located in Abu Rawash could be the tomb of Nebka. Dodson states that it is a "mudbrick enclosure  with a  central square massif of the same material, located north of the modern village of Abu Roash, known as El Dair. It has been badly damaged by drainage work since first being discovered in 1902, and now may be beyond saving. However, the plan seems to closely resemble royal funerary monuments of the late Second and early Third Dynasties, while pottery from the site has been dated to the latter period".

On the other hand, some Egyptologists have noticed that Nebka's name seems to be inscribed in the Unfinished Northern Pyramid of Zawyet El Aryan under the form Nebkara, so that this structure could have been started by this king. More precisely, they point to several graffiti made of black and red ink which were found in the chamber and in the descending stairway of the pyramid. Alessandro Barsanti recorded at least 67 inscriptions with the names of different workmen crews as well as the name of the planned pyramid complex: Seba ?-Ka, meaning "The Star of ?-Ka". The workmen crew whose name appears most often — thus being the leading crew during the building works — was Wer-ef-seba ?-Ka, meaning "Great Like the Star of (King) ?-Ka". Inscription No. 35 gives the name Neferka-Nefer (meaning "His Beautiful Ka is Flawless"), but otherwise lacks any reference to known people from the Third or Fourth Dynasty, to which this pyramid is usually ascribed. Graffiti No. 15 and No. 52 mention the royal name Nebkarâ, meaning "Lord of the Ka of Râ" and a further inscription, No. 55, mentions a possible Horus of Gold name: Neb hedjet-nwb, meaning "Lord of the Golden Crown". Some Egyptologists propose that this is either the Horus name of king Huni or the Horus of Gold name of Nebka.

References and sources

References

Sources

 

 

27th-century BC Pharaohs
Pharaohs of the Third Dynasty of Egypt